The Dominant Sex is a 1937 British comedy film directed by Herbert Brenon and starring Phillips Holmes, Diana Churchill and Romney Brent. The film was based on a play by Michael Egan. It was made by British International Pictures at its main Elstree Studios. The film's art direction was by Cedric Dawe.

Cast
 Phillips Holmes as Dick Shale 
 Diana Churchill as Angela Shale 
 Romney Brent as Joe Clayton 
 Carol Goodner as Gwen Clayton 
 Billy Milton as Alec Winstone 
 Hugh Miller as Philip Carson 
 Kathleen Kelly as Mary 
 Olga Edwardes as Lucy Webster 
 Charles Paton as Mr. Webster

References

Bibliography
 Low, Rachael. Filmmaking in 1930s Britain. George Allen & Unwin, 1985.
 Wood, Linda. British Films, 1927-1939. British Film Institute, 1986.

External links

1937 films
British comedy films
British black-and-white films
1937 comedy films
1930s English-language films
Films directed by Herbert Brenon
Films shot at British International Pictures Studios
British films based on plays
1930s British films